Shemesh means "Sun" in Hebrew. It may also refer to:

People
Chaim Shavesh , South African born, 
Shavesh (unknown )   
 Shavesh, many

Sports clubs

Bet Shemesh Blue Sox, Israeli baseball team from Bet Shemesh
Hapoel Beit Shemesh F.C., Israeli football club based at Beit Shemesh
Ironi Beit Shemesh F.C., Israeli football club based in Beit Shemesh

Locations
Beit Shemesh, Israeli pre-Biblical city
Beth Shemesh, name of three distinct biblical places in Israel and one location in Egypt also mentioned in the Hebrew Bible
Givat Shemesh, village and drug rehabilitation centre in central Israel
Ramat Beit Shemesh, neighborhood of Beit Shemesh, Israel

Other

Beit Shemesh Railway Station, Israel Railways station in Beit Shemesh, Israel
Shamash, solar deity in ancient Semitic religion
Shapash (redirect from Shemesh (Canaanite goddess)), was the Canaanite goddess of the sun, daughter of El and Asherah
Shemesh (TV series), Israeli sitcom produced by Teddy Productions and aired on Israeli Channel 2 from 1997 to 2004